Chionaemopsis is a genus of moths of the family Yponomeutidae.

Species
Chionaemopsis quadrifasciatus - Cockerell & Le Veque, 1931 

Yponomeutidae